The Jiabao V80 is a five- to eight-seater Microvan made by FAW Jilin under the Jiabao sub-brand.

Overview
Launched in 2013 during the 2013 Shanghai Auto Show, the Jiabao V80 was powered by either a 1.3 liter Inline-four petrol engine or a 1.5 liter Inline-four petrol engine. 

The Jiabao V80 was priced between 40,900 yuan and 53,900 yuan.

FAW Jiefang T80/T90
The Jiefang T80 and Jiefang T90 (解放T80/ T90) is the pickup version of the Jiabao V80 microvan, with the Jiefang T80 is available as regular single cab and double cab pickup versions and the Jiefang T90 is the jacked up heavy duty version. The T80 was priced from 34,900 yuan to 40,400 yuan, while the T90 was priced from 46,500 yuan to 50,500 yuan.

Engine options of the Jiefang T80 includes a 1.2 liter Inline-four petrol engine or a 1.5 liter Inline-four petrol engine. The Jiefang T90 only has the 1.5 liter Inline-four petrol engine option.

Higer H4E
The Higer H4E is the rebadged electric version of the FAW Jiabao V80. Code named KLQ5020XXYEV5, the Higer H4E is only available as a panel van, and comes in either a 2-seat version or a 2+3 seat version. 

The H4E was powered by a 60 kw and 250 N·m electric motor placed in the rear, equipped with a 40.7 kWh battery capable of a range of 255 km with fast charging taking 2.5 hours and regular ones 12 hours. The Higer H4E was priced from 223,000 yuan to 258,000 yuan.

NAC Chang Da H9

The NAC Chang Da H9 (畅达 H9) is another rebadged electric version of the FAW Jiabao V80 produced by Chang Da, NEV sub-brand of Nanjing Automobile and SAIC. 

Established in 2009, Chang Da has been developing electric light logistics vans for "the last mile" delivery. The first product, NAC Chang Da H9 is based on the structure of FAW Jiabao V80 and took three years to develop before being launched in 2017. The Chang Da H9 could be either bought or leased in fleets.

References

External links
Official V80 website
Official T80 double cab website
Official T80 website

Jiabao V80
Rear-wheel-drive vehicles
Microvans
2010s cars
Cars introduced in 2013
Cars of China
Production electric cars